|}
{| class="collapsible collapsed" cellpadding="0" cellspacing="0" style="clear:right; float:right; text-align:center; font-weight:bold;" width="280px"
! colspan="3" style="border:1px solid black; background-color: #77DD77;" | Also Ran

The 2007 Epsom Derby was a horse race which took place at Epsom Downs on Saturday 2 June 2007. It was the 228th running of the Derby, and it was won by the pre-race favourite Authorized. The winner was ridden by Frankie Dettori and trained by Peter Chapple-Hyam. The race was notable for the fact that eight of the seventeen runners were trained by Aidan O'Brien.

Race details
 Sponsor: Vodafone
 Winner's prize money: £709,750
 Going: Good
 Number of runners: 17
 Winner's time: 2m 34.77s

Full result

* The distances between the horses are shown in lengths or shorter. shd = short-head; hd = head; nk = neck.† Trainers are based in Great Britain unless indicated.

Winner's details
Further details of the winner, Authorized:

 Foaled: 14 February 2004 in Ireland
 Sire: Montjeu; Dam: Funsie (Saumarez)
 Owner: Saleh Al Homaizi and Imad Al Sagar
 Breeder: Marengo Investments, Knighton House Ltd and Michael Kinane
 Rating in 2007 World Thoroughbred Racehorse Rankings: 129

Form analysis

Two-year-old races
Notable runs by the future Derby participants as two-year-olds in 2006.

 Authorized – 3rd Haynes, Hanson and Clark Stakes, 1st Racing Post Trophy
 Eagle Mountain – 2nd Futurity Stakes, 2nd Champagne Stakes, 1st Beresford Stakes, 4th Racing Post Trophy
 Aqaleem – 2nd Haynes, Hanson and Clark Stakes
 Soldier of Fortune – 2nd Critérium de Saint-Cloud
 Kid Mambo – 2nd Autumn Stakes
 Yellowstone – 7th Futurity Stakes, 3rd Critérium International
 Admiralofthefleet – 3rd Superlative Stakes, 1st Royal Lodge Stakes
 Anton Chekhov – 1st Eyrefield Stakes
 Regime – 2nd Goffs Million, 7th Racing Post Trophy
 Petara Bay – 10th Racing Post Trophy
 Strategic Prince – 5th Norfolk Stakes, 1st July Stakes, 1st Vintage Stakes, 3rd Dewhurst Stakes

The road to Epsom
Early-season appearances in 2007 and trial races prior to running in the Derby.

 Authorized – 1st Dante Stakes
 Eagle Mountain – 5th 2,000 Guineas
 Aqaleem – 1st Lingfield Derby Trial
 Lucarno – 1st Fairway Stakes
 Soldier of Fortune – 1st Prix Noailles, 1st Chester Vase
 Salford Mill – 2nd Feilden Stakes, 1st Newmarket Stakes
 Kid Mambo – 3rd Lingfield Derby Trial
 Yellowstone – 5th Leopardstown 2,000 Guineas Trial Stakes, 11th 2,000 Guineas, 2nd Derrinstown Stud Derby Trial
 Acapulco – 2nd Newmarket Stakes
 Admiralofthefleet – 7th Leopardstown 2,000 Guineas Trial Stakes, 1st Dee Stakes
 Mahler – 1st Gowran Classic Trial
 Anton Chekhov – 5th Ballysax Stakes, 1st Prix Hocquart
 Regime – 1st Sandown Classic Trial
 Petara Bay – 1st Feilden Stakes, 7th Sandown Classic Trial
 Strategic Prince – 8th 2,000 Guineas
 Archipenko – 1st Derrinstown Stud Derby Trial

Subsequent Group 1 wins
Group 1 / Grade I victories after running in the Derby.

 Authorized – International Stakes (2007)
 Eagle Mountain – Hong Kong Cup (2008)
 Lucarno – St. Leger (2007)
 Soldier of Fortune – Irish Derby (2007), Coronation Cup (2008)
 Salford Mill (renamed Helene Mascot) – Hong Kong Classic Mile (2008), Hong Kong Derby (2008)
 Archipenko – Queen Elizabeth II Cup (2008)

Subsequent breeding careers
Leading progeny of participants in the 2007 Epsom Derby.

Sires of Group/Grade One winners
Authorized (1st)
 Santiago - 1st Irish Derby (2020)
 Seal Of Approval - 1st British Champions Fillies and Mares Stakes (2013)
 Nichols Canyon - 1st Stayers' Hurdle (2017)
 Tiger Roll - 1st Grand National (2018, 2019)

Sires of Group/Grade One winners
Strategic Prince (16th) - Later exported to Argentina
 La Collina - 1st Phoenix Stakes (2011)
 Saent - 1st Derby Italiano (2016)
 Redact - 2nd Derby Italiano (2011)
 Uppertown Prince - 2nd Prestige Novices' Hurdle (2018)
Archipenko (17th)
 Madame Chiang - 1st British Champions Fillies and Mares Stakes (2014)
 Time Warp - 1st Hong Kong Cup (2017)
 Glorious Forever - 1st Hong Kong Cup (2018)
 Va Bank - 3rd Bayerisches Zuchtrennen (2018)

Sires of National Hunt horses
Lucarno (4th)
 Dame de Compagnie - 1st Coral Cup (2020)
 Darlac - 2nd Winter Novices' Hurdle (2018)
Soldier Of Fortune (5th)
 Early Doors - 2nd Christmas Hurdle (2018)
 Scarpeta - 3rd Festival Novice Hurdle (2018)
 Tin Soldier - 3rd Irish Daily Mirror Novice Hurdle (2017)
 Rey Del Rock - 1st Gran Premio Hipodromo Chile (2016)
Mahler (11th)
 Chris's Dream - 1st Red Mills Chase (2020)
 Ornua - 1st Maghull Novices' Chase (2019)
 Sutton Place - 1st Boyne Hurdle (2017)
 Ms Parfois - 2nd National Hunt Chase Challenge Cup (2018)

Other Stallions
Eagle Mountain (2nd) - Exported to New ZealandSalford Mill (6th) (renamed Helene Mascot) - Exported to AustraliaYellowstone (8th) - Flat and jumps winners in FranceLeander (14th) - Etheridge Annie (maiden hurdler)Admiralofthefleet (10th) - Exported to India

References
 
 sportinglife.com

Epsom Derby
 2007
Epsom Derby
Epsom Derby
2000s in Surrey